Evan Rotundo (born July 9, 2004) is an American soccer player currently playing as a midfielder for Belgian club Jong Genk.

Club career
Born in La Mesa, California to an American father and French mother, Rotundo started his career with San Diego Albion and the San Diego Surf. Trials with Manchester City, Arsenal and Caen followed, before he signed for German side Schalke 04 in 2020. In October 2021 he was named by English newspaper The Guardian as one of the best players born in 2004 worldwide.

In September 2022, he moved to Belgian side Genk, signing a three-year deal. He was assigned to the reserve squad Jong Genk which plays in the second-tier Challenger Pro League.

International career
Rotundo has represented The United States at under-15 and under-17 level.

Career statistics

Club

Notes

References

2004 births
Living people
American people of French descent
People from La Mesa, California
Soccer players from California
American soccer players
United States men's youth international soccer players
Association football midfielders
FC Schalke 04 players
Jong Genk players
Challenger Pro League players
American expatriate soccer players
Expatriate footballers in Germany
American expatriate soccer players in Germany
Expatriate footballers in Belgium
American expatriate sportspeople in Belgium